is a Japanese voice actor. He started acting in 2003 and is affiliated with Mausu Promotion, with his talent agency managed by: Katsuta Voice Actor's Academy. He graduated from Tokyo Announce Gakuin Performing Arts College.

Filmography
Major roles are highlighted in bold.

Anime television series
2011
 30-sai no Hoken Taiiku - Ginga Hoshi
2021
 The Aquatope on White Sand - Gousuke Guden

Anime OVA series
2006
 Demon Prince Enma - Nobusuma

Video games
2022
 AI: The Somnium Files – nirvanA Initiative - Gen

Dubbing work

Live-action television
 CSI: Miami
 Drop Dead Diva - Additional Voices (Season 1, Episode 5: Lost & Found) 
 Frankenstein - Frederick (Ondrej Koval)
 Hotelier - I Shunin (Kim Jeong-Sik) 
 iCarly
 Laughing in the Wind - Tóng Bǎixióng (Seung Tsundie)
 Prison Break - Manche Sanchez (Joseph Nunez)
 Ugly Betty - Cliff St. Paul (David Blue)

Live-action films
 Ant-Man and the Wasp: Quantumania – Xolum
 Australia – Additional Voices
 Big Momma's House 2 – Bishop (Christopher Jones)
 Birds of Prey – Happy (Matt Willig)
 Die Krähen – Additional Voices
 Disturbia – Additional Voices
 Lions for Lambs – Additional Voices
 Sinister – Sheriff (Fred Thompson)
 The Final Cut – Additional Voices
 The Santa Clause 3: The Escape Clause – Additional Voices
 There Will Be Blood – Additional Voices

Animated films
 Lego Marvel Super Heroes: Avengers Reassembled - Bruce Banner/Hulk

Television animation
 Avengers Assemble - Bruce Banner/Hulk
 Hulk and the Agents of S.M.A.S.H. -  Bruce Banner/Hulk
 The Avengers: Earth's Mightiest Heroes - Bruce Banner/Hulk, T'Challa/Black Panther
 Ultimate Spider-Man -  Bruce Banner/Hulk

References

External links
 
 

1976 births
Living people
Male voice actors from Ibaraki Prefecture
Japanese male voice actors
Mausu Promotion voice actors